Joseph Richard Begich (January 17, 1930 – August 10, 2019) was an American politician in the state of Minnesota. He was born in Eveleth, Minnesota. He was an alumnus of the Northwest School of Agriculture, and was a grain and livestock farmer. Begich served in the United States Army. He served as mayor of Eveleth, Minnesota, from 1965 to 1974, when he was elected to the Minnesota Legislature. He served in the House of Representatives for District 6A from 1975 to 1982 and for District 6B from 1983 to 1992. He was married to Carolyn and had one daughter. He was the brother of United States Congressman from Alaska, Nick Begich, who disappeared in 1972 while riding a plane, and the uncle of former United States Senator from Alaska, Mark Begich. Begich died at a nursing home in Eveleth in 2019 at the age of 89.

References

1930 births
2019 deaths
Mayors of places in Minnesota
Democratic Party members of the Minnesota House of Representatives
People from Eveleth, Minnesota
Farmers from Minnesota
Military personnel from Minnesota
20th-century American politicians
Begich family